Riparovenator ("riverbank hunter") is a genus of baryonychine spinosaurid dinosaur from the Early Cretaceous (Barremian) period of Britain, the type species is Riparovenator milnerae.

Discovery and naming
 
Between 2013 and 2017, spinosaurid fossils were uncovered at the beach near the Chilton Chine before being brought to Dinosaur Isle. Such remains had been generally referred to Baryonyx but were understood recently to represent two species new to science.

In 2021, the type species Riparovenator milnerae was named and described by a team of palaeontologists including Chris T. Barker, David William Elliot Hone, Darren Naish, Andrea Cau, Jeremy A.F. Lockwood, Brian Foster, Claire E. Clarkin, Philipp Schneider and Neil John Gostling. The generic name is derived from the Latin rīpārius, "of the river bank", and vēnātor, "hunter". The specific name honors Angela Milner, deceased in August 2021.

The holotype remains of this taxon consist of IWCMS 2014.95.6 (premaxillary bodies), IWCMS 2014.96.1, 2; 2020.448.1, 2 (a disarticulated braincase) and IWCMS 2014.96.3 (a partial lacrimal and prefrontal), all of which were recovered from rocks in the Chilton Chine of the Wessex Formation. Referred remains include a posterior nasal fragment (IWCMS 2014.95.7) and an extensive caudal axial series of twenty-two vertebrae (IWCMS 2020.447.1-39), representing around fifty individual bones in total.

Description

Riparovenator is estimated to have measured about 8.5 metres (28 feet) in length based on the skeletal reconstruction in the describing paper by Dan Folkes.

Classification
In 2021, Riparovenator was, within Spinosauridae, placed into the Baryonychinae. The authors in a cladistic analysis recovered Riparovenator as a member of the newly erected clade, Ceratosuchopsini, closely related to Suchomimus and the coeval Ceratosuchops, its sister species.

Palaeoecology 
Riparovenator lived in a dry Mediterranean habitat in the Wessex Formation, where rivers were home to riparian galleries. Like most spinosaurids, it would have fed on aquatic prey as well as other terrestrial prey in these areas.

References

Spinosaurids
Monotypic dinosaur genera
Barremian life
Early Cretaceous dinosaurs of Europe
Cretaceous England
Fossils of England
Fossil taxa described in 2021
Taxa named by Darren Naish